Istinite priče I deo (True Stories Part I) is the second studio album by the Serbian punk rock band Goblini, released by Metropolis Records in 1994. The album was available on compact cassette only, until it was rereleased with five tracks from the debut album as bonus tracks in 1998 as the second disc of the Turneja u magnovenju 96/97 live album.

Track listing 
All music, lyrics and arrangements by Goblini, except the tracks 2 and 3, written by Aleksandar Nišević and Darko Dobrodolac.

Bonus tracks on the 1998 CD reissue

Personnel 
 Vlada Kokotović — bass, backing vocals
 Nedeljko Nedić "Meketa" — drums, backing vocals
 Nenad Divnić "Kića" — drums (tracks 3, 4, 6, 10, 11)
 Alen Jovanović — guitar, backing vocals
 Branko Golubović "Golub" — vocals
 Predrag Pejić — producer, recorded by
 Aleksandar Stamenković — recorded by
 Leo Fon Punkerstain — artwork by
 Petra — photography by

References 

 Istinite priče I deo at Discogs
 CD reissue at Discogs
 EX YU ROCK enciklopedija 1960-2006, Janjatović Petar; 

1994 albums
Goblini albums
Metropolis Records (Serbia) albums